Digory Chamond (died 1611), of Launcells, Cornwall, was an English politician.

He was a Member (MP) of the Parliament of England for Bodmin in 1559, and sheriff of Cornwall in 1606–7.

References

16th-century births
1611 deaths
English MPs 1559
Politicians from Cornwall
Members of the pre-1707 English Parliament for constituencies in Cornwall
High Sheriffs of Cornwall